Bengt Persson is a Swedish football manager. He was Djurgårdens IF manager in 1975–78. Later in his career for rivals Hammarby IF.

References

Swedish football managers
Djurgårdens IF Fotboll managers
Living people
Year of birth missing (living people)
Place of birth missing (living people)